Posht Tang-e Cheshmeh Qolijan (also Romanized as Posht Tang-e Cheshmeh Qolījān; also known as Cheshmeh Qolīkhān) is a village in Dowlatabad Rural District, in the Central District of Ravansar County, Kermanshah Province, Iran. At the 2006 census, its population was 145, in 29 families.

References 

Populated places in Ravansar County